The Logic of Chance is the second album by dan le sac vs Scroobius Pip, released on 15 March 2010. The name of the album was taken from the title of a book by John Venn, the inventor of the Venn Diagram.

Track listing

The track "Cauliflower" features an American female singer who performs under the pseudonym Kid A. The track "Cowboi" features Bristol-based musician Kid Carpet.

References

2010 albums
Dan le Sac Vs Scroobius Pip albums
Sunday Best (music company) albums